Sharpies, or Sharps, were members of suburban youth gangs in Australia, most significantly from the 1960s and 1970s. They were particularly prominent in Melbourne, but were also found in Sydney and Perth to lesser extents. Sharpies were known for being violent, although a strict moral code was also evident. The name comes from their focus on looking and dressing "sharp".

Sharpie culture
Sharpies would often congregate in large numbers, regularly attending live bands at town hall and high school dances

Common clothing items included Lee or Levi jeans, cardigans, jumpers, and T-shirts—often individually designed by group members.

Mods were an enemy of sharpies, and their gang brawls were reported in the newspapers during 1966. In a 2002 interview, a former sharpie stated that despite the sharpie culture being quite violent – especially as they crossed other gangs' territories on the public transport network – the altercations were restricted to inter-gang rivalries.

Sharpies were particularly fond of Australian pub rock and hard rock groups such as Rose Tattoo, Lobby Lloyde and the Coloured Balls and Billy Thorpe and the Aztecs.

Sharpies in popular culture
Photographer Rennie Ellis has included portraits of sharpies in his works
Queeny (1994), Deep (1997), and Suburban Warriors (2003) are short films by Rebecca McLean related to sharpies
Blackburn South Sharpies' member Peter Robertson curated Sharpies, a photographic exhibition at the Museum of Contemporary Art in Sydney in 2001–02, and also as part of the 2002 Melbourne International Fashion Festival
Blackburn South Sharpies' member Larry Jenkins also photographically documented this gang
The Australian Broadcasting Corporation featured sharpies in a 2002 episode of George Negus' New Dimensions in Time
Comedian Magda Szubanski was a sharpie in her youth and parodied the subculture on Fast Forward.
Levi released "Levi's Black Sharps", a denim range inspired by sharpies
Top Fellas: The Story of Melbourne's Sharpie Cult is a 2004 book by Tadhg Taylor on Melbourne's sharpies
Rage: A Sharpie's Journal Melbourne 1974–1980 is a 2010 book by Julie Mac on Melbourne's sharpies
 Out with the Boys: The Sharpie Days is a 2011 book by the Seagull about the Sydney Sharpies of the 1960s
Once Were Sharps: The colourful life and times of the Thomastown Sharps is a book by Nick Tolewski, written by Dean Crozier
 A resurgence of interest in the Sharpie sub-culture in recent times included Skins'n'Sharps Exhibitions in 2006 (Dante's Gallery, Fitzroy) and 2010 (Kustom Lane Gallery, Hawthorn) and a dedicated website Skins'n'Sharps

References

External links
Deep – short film by Rebecca McLean that features sharpies

Gangs in Australia
Australian fringe and underground culture
Street gangs
History of Australia (1945–present)
Social history of Australia
Australian English
Skinhead
Australian youth culture